WVNT (1230 AM) is a radio station broadcasting a News Talk Information format. Licensed to Parkersburg, West Virginia, United States, it serves the Parkersburg-Marietta area.  The station is currently owned by Burbach Of WV, Llc.

Station programming includes:
WV Metro News;
Sports and a Donut, hosted by Chad Richards;
Highway to Health with "Healthy Dave" Hawkins; 
Business Matters with Bonnie Grady;
Dave Ramsey;
Science Fantastic with Dr. Michio Kaku;
The Jerry Doyle Show;
Jim Bohanan;
Neil Bortz;
Dennis Miller;

From April 13, 1998, until March 2004, the station aired Radio Disney, a format targeted towards tweens and young teens.

The station is home to local sports, including:
Parkersburg Catholic Sports, and Marshall Football

External links

VNT